Cnemaspis avasabinae, or Sabin's Nellore dwarf gecko, is a species of gecko endemic to India. It is found in the Eastern Ghats.

Description
The species is distinct from all other Cnemaspis species in its small size of 29 mm (or slightly more than 1⅛ in.) from snout to vent. It is coloured grey-pink on the dorsal (back) side and has six pairs of dark brown patches running down its back.  Notably, the males of this species lack femoral pores.

Habitat
The gecko is currently known from only one locality in Andhra Pradesh's Nellore district, in the Velikonda Range of the Eastern Ghats. The locality is near a stream in a dry evergreen forest at an elevation of 200 m above sea level.

Habit
The gecko is rock-dwelling, and is active at and just after dusk.

References

avasabinae
Reptiles of India
Endemic fauna of India
Reptiles described in 2020
Taxa named by Ishan Agarwal
Taxa named by Aaron M. Bauer
Taxa named by Akshay Khandekar